Paul R. Parrette (January 28, 1906, Utah - October 17, 1980) was a former general manager of the Philippine Manufacturing Company in the Philippines. He was also one of the original board of trustees of the Philippine Rural Reconstruction Movement.  He was married to Frances E. Parrette (born on August 17, 1907 - died on September 13, 1963).

See also
History of the Philippines (1898–1946)
Commonwealth (U.S. insular area)
Thomasites

References

Businesspeople from Utah
American expatriates in the Philippines
1980 deaths
1906 births
20th-century American businesspeople